The Juno Awards (representing Canadian music industry achievements of the previous year ) from 1992, were awarded on 29th of March in Toronto at a ceremony in the O'Keefe Centre. Rick Moranis was the host for the ceremonies, which were broadcast on CBC Television from 9 pm Eastern.

Nominations were announced on 12 February 1992. Bryan Adams was nominated in 7 categories setting a Juno record, while Tom Cochrane received nominations in 6.

Adams sparked controversy in the Canadian music industry several months earlier when he openly criticised Canadian content regulations when his album project, Waking Up the Neighbours, was disqualified as Canadian for radio airplay purposes. That album was created largely with the help of non-Canadian producer Robert John "Mutt" Lange, therefore the songs fell below the legal Canadian content threshold. However, Adams qualified for the 1992 Juno nominations as an individual Canadian citizen. The 1992 Juno Awards thus became viewed as a showdown between Adams and Tom Cochrane, as the latter met Canadian content requirements.

When all the 1992 Juno Awards were presented, Tom Cochrane was the major winner with 4 Junos, compared to 3 for Adams. 1992's awards also featured an unprecedented three-way tie for winners in the Best Jazz Album category.

Nominees and winners

Canadian Entertainer of the Year
Determined by public ballot.

Winner: Bryan Adams

Other Nominees:
 Blue Rodeo
 Celine Dion
 Colin James
 The Tragically Hip

Best Female Vocalist
Winner: Celine Dion

Other Nominees:
 Lee Aaron
 Loreena McKennitt
 Sarah McLachlan
 Mitsou

Best Male Vocalist
Winner: Tom Cochrane

Other Nominees:
 Bryan Adams
 Bruce Cockburn
 Maestro Fresh-Wes
 Robbie Robertson

Most Promising Female Vocalist
Winner: Alanis

Other Nominees:
 Kerri Anderson
 Meryn Cadell
 Darby Mills
 Chrissy Steele

Note: Julie Masse was originally nominated here but was disqualified prior to the awards because her album was deemed to have been released 21 August 1990. Juno rules had set 1 September 1990 as the earliest date for which an album could qualify for the 1992 awards. Masse's nomination for this category was replaced by Meryn Cadell.

Most Promising Male Vocalist
Winner: Keven Jordan

Other Nominees:
 Stephen Fearing
 Lennie Gallant
 Glen Stace
 Wild T

Group of the Year
Winner: Crash Test Dummies

Other Nominees:
 Blue Rodeo
 Glass Tiger
 Rush
 The Tragically Hip

Most Promising Group
Winner: Infidels

Other Nominees:
 The Rankin Family
 West End Girls
 World on Edge
 Young Saints

Songwriter of the Year
Winner: Tom Cochrane

Other Nominees:
 Bryan Adams
 Bruce Cockburn
 Shirley Eikhard
 Marc Jordan

Best Country Female Vocalist
Winner: Cassandra Vasik

Other Nominees:
 Carroll Baker
 Cindi Cain
 Joan Kennedy
 Anne Murray

Best Country Male Vocalist
Winner: George Fox

Other Nominees:
 Gary Fjellgaard
 Lennie Gallant
 Mark Koenig
 Ian Tyson

Best Country Group or Duo
Winner: Prairie Oyster

Other Nominees:
 Grievous Angels
 Joel Feeney and Western Front
 The Rankin Family
 Straight Clean & Simple

International Achievement Award
 Bryan Adams

Best Instrumental Artist
Winner: Shadowy Men on a Shadowy Planet

Other Nominees:
 John Arpin
 Jacques de Koninck
 David Foster
 Graham Townsend

Foreign Entertainer of the Year
Winner: Garth Brooks

Other Nominees:
 Michael Bolton
 Phil Collins
 MC Hammer
 Rod Stewart

Best Producer
Winner: Bryan Adams (with Robert John "Mutt" Lange), "(Everything I Do) I Do It for You" and "Can't Stop This Thing We Started"

Other Nominees:
 Tom Cochrane, Mad Mad World
 Geddy Lee, Alex Lifeson, Neil Peart with Rupert Hine, Roll the Bones
 Loreena McKennitt with Brian Hughes, The Visit
 Bob Rock with James Hetfield, Lars Ulrich, "Enter Sandman" by Metallica and Primal Scream by Mötley Crüe

Best Recording Engineer
Winner: Mike Fraser, "Thunderstruck" and "Money Talks" by AC/DC

Other Nominees:
 Scott Boyling, Paul Milner, John Naslen, "No Sign of Rain" and "Path to You" by Keven Jordan
 Kevin Doyle, "Slowly Slipping Away" by Harem Scarem
 Greg Reely, "D for Democracy" and "Political" for Spirit of the West
 Randy Staub, "Enter Sandman" by Metallica, "Dollar In My Pocket (Pretty Things)" for Big House

Canadian Music Hall of Fame
Winner: Ian and Sylvia Tyson

Walt Grealis Special Achievement Award
Winner: (posthumous) Harold Moon

Nominated and winning albums

Best Album
Winner: Mad Mad World, Tom Cochrane

Other Nominees:
 The Ghosts That Haunt Me, Crash Test Dummies
 Highlights From The Phantom of the Opera, cast members of the Canadian production of this musical
 Road Apples, The Tragically Hip
 Waking Up the Neighbours, Bryan Adams

Best Children's Album
Winner: Vivaldi's Ring of Mystery, Classical Kids, producer Susan Hammond

Other Nominees:
 Children of the Morning, Jack Grunsky
 Happy Feet, Fred Penner
 Rendezvous Soleil, Claire de Lune
 Swing on a Star, Claire de Lune

Best Classical Album (Solo or Chamber Ensemble)
Winner: Liszt: Années De Pelerinage, Louis Lortie piano

Other Nominees:
 Ravel: Music for Four Hands, Louis Lortie and Helene Mercier
 Maurice Ravel: Piano Works Vol. 1, André Laplante
 Alessandro Scarlatti: Cantatas, Nancy Argenta
 Smetana: Complete Czech Dances, Antonin Kubelek

Best Classical Album (Large Ensemble)
Winner: Debussy: Pelleas et Melisande, Montreal Symphony Orchestra, conductor Charles Dutoit

Other Nominees:
 Bloch: Schelomo and Bruch Koi Nidrel, Ofra Harnoy
 Mozart: German Dances, Tafelmusik
 Mozart: Overtures, Tafelmusik
 Mozart: Six Symphonies After Serenades, Tafelmusik

Best Album Design
Winner: Hugh Syme, Roll The Bones by Rush

Other Nominees:
 Robert Leboeuf, Art Bergmann by Art Bergmann
 Robert Leboeuf, Young Saints by Young Saints
 Kevin Mutch, The Ghosts That Haunt Me by Crash Test Dummies
 Hugh Syme, Big House by Big House

Best Selling Album by a Foreign Artist
Winner: To The Extreme, Vanilla Ice

Other Nominees:
 Gonna Make You Sweat, C&C Music Factory
 Metallica, Metallica
 Time, Love and Tenderness, Michael Bolton
 The Razor's Edge, AC/DC

Best Jazz Album
Winners (3-way tie):
 For The Moment, Renee Rosnes
 In Transition, Brian Dickinson
 The Brass Is Back, Rob McConnell and the Boss Brass

Other Nominees:
 Climbing, Barry Elmes
 Gliding, Stan Samole

Best Selling Francophone Album
Winner: Sauvez mon âme, Luc de Larochellière

Other Nominees:
 L'Album du peuple, François Pérusse
 Kathleen, Kathleen Sergerie
 Snob, Les B.B.
 Vilain Pingouin, Vilain Pingouin

Note: Julie Masse was originally nominated here but was disqualified prior to the awards because her album was deemed to have been released 21 August 1990. Juno rules had set 1 September 1990 as the earliest date for which an album could qualify for the 1992 awards. Masse's nomination for this category was replaced by Kathleen.

Hard Rock Album of the Year
Winner: Roll the Bones, Rush

Other Nominees:
 Big House, Big House
 Love Machine, Brighton Rock
 Magnet to Steele, Chrissy Steele
 Some Girls Do, Lee Aaron

Best Roots & Traditional Album
Winners (tie):
 Various Artists, Saturday Night Blues
 Loreena McKennitt, The Visit

Other Nominees:
 Bruce Cockburn, Nothing But a Burning Light
 Kashtin, Innu
 The Rankin Family, Fare Thee Well Love

Nominated and winning releases

Single of the Year
Winner: "Life Is a Highway", Tom Cochrane

Other Nominees:
 "Animal Heart", Glass Tiger
 "Can't Stop This Thing We Started", Bryan Adams
 "(Everything I Do) I Do It For You", Bryan Adams
 "Too Hot", Alanis

Best Classical Composition
Winner: Concerto For Piano & Chamber Orchestra, Michael Conway Baker

Other Nominees:
 Dream Rainbow Dream Thunder, R. Murray Schafer
 Improvisation on a Blue Theme, John Thrower
 Memorial to Martin Luther King, Oskar Morawetz
 Virelai, Patrick Cardy

Best Selling Single by a Foreign Artist
Winner: "More Than Words", Extreme

Other Nominees:
 "Black or White", Michael Jackson
 "Enter Sandman", Metallica
 "Joyride", Roxette
 "Unbelievable", EMF

Best R&B/Soul Recording
Winner: Call My Name, Love & Sas

Other Nominees:
 All Talk, Lorraine Scott
 Destiny, Simply Majestic
 Got 2 Have Your Love, Helen Sharpe
 Let Me Go, Debbie Johnson

Rap Recording of the Year
Winner: My Definition of a Boombastic Jazz Style, Dream Warriors

Other Nominees:
 Conductin' Things, Maestro Fresh-Wes
 Jamaican Funk: Canadian Style, Michie Mee and L.A. Luv
 Play the Music DJ, Simply Majestic
 She's a Flirt (Let's Do It), Kish

Best World Beat Recording
Winner: The Gathering, various artists

Other Nominees:
 Haï Musik, Anoosh
 Innu, Kashtin
 The Flying Bulgar Klezmer Band, Flying Bulgar Klezmer Band
 Till the Bars Break, Jeannette Armstrong

Best Dance Recording
Winner: "Everyone's a Winner" (Chocolate Movement mix), Bootsauce

Other Nominees:
 "Good Together" (Wicked mix), Candi & The Backbeat
 "I Don't Need Yo Kiss" (The 12 Inch mix), Love & Sas
 "I'll Respect You" (club mix), Debbie Johnson
 "Too Hot" (Hott Shot mix), Alanis

Best Video
Winner: Phil Kates, "Into The Fire" by Sarah McLachlan

Other Nominees:
 Lyne Charlebois, "Political" by Spirit of the West
 Alain DesRochers, "Dis Moi, Dis Moi" by Mitsou
 Dale Heslip, "Superman's Song" by Crash Test Dummies
 David Storey, "Life is a Highway" by Tom Cochrane

References

External links
Juno Awards site

1992
1992 music awards
1992 in Canadian music